Leonardo da Vinci was the last of three  dreadnoughts built for the  (Royal Italian Navy) in the early 1910s. Completed just before the beginning of World War I, the ship saw no action and was sunk by a magazine explosion in 1916 with the loss of 248 officers and enlisted men. The Italians blamed Austro-Hungarian saboteurs for her loss, but it may have been accidental. Leonardo da Vinci was refloated in 1919 and plans were made to repair her. Budgetary constraints did not permit this, and her hulk was sold for scrap in 1923.

Design and description
The Conte di Cavour class was designed to counter the French  dreadnoughts which caused them to be slower and more heavily armored than the first Italian dreadnought, . They had a crew of 31 officers and 969 enlisted men. They were powered by three sets of Parsons steam turbines, two sets driving the outer propeller shafts and one set the two inner shafts. Steam for the turbines was provided by twenty Blechynden water-tube boilers, eight of which burned oil and twelve of which burned both fuel oil and coal.

Armament and armor

The main battery of the Conte di Cavour class consisted of thirteen 305-millimeter Model 1909 guns, in five centerline gun turrets, with a twin-gun turret superfiring over a triple-gun turret in fore and aft pairs, and a third triple turret amidships. Their secondary armament consisted of eighteen  guns mounted in casemates on the sides of the hull. For defense against torpedo boats, the ships carried fourteen  guns; thirteen of these could be mounted on the turret tops, but they could be positioned in 30 different locations, including some on the forecastle and upper decks. They were also fitted with three submerged  torpedo tubes, one on each broadside and the third in the stern.

The Conte di Cavour-class ships had a complete waterline armor belt that had a maximum thickness of  amidships, which reduced to  towards the stern and  towards the bow. The walls of the forward conning tower were 280 millimeters thick.

Construction and service
Leonardo da Vinci, named after the artist and inventor, was built by the Odero Shipbuilding Co., at their Sestri Ponente, Genoa shipyard. She was laid down on 18 July 1910, launched on 14 October 1911, and completed on 17 May 1914. The ship saw no combat during the war and spent most of it at anchor. Admiral Paolo Thaon di Revel, the Italian naval chief of staff, believed that Austro-Hungarian submarines and minelayers could operate too effectively in the narrow waters of the Adriatic. The threat from these underwater weapons to his capital ships was too serious for him to actively deploy the fleet. Instead, Revel decided to implement a blockade at the relatively safer southern end of the Adriatic with the battle fleet, while smaller vessels, such as MAS torpedo boats, conducted raids on Austro-Hungarian ships and installations. Meanwhile, Revel's battleships would be preserved to confront the Austro-Hungarian battle fleet in the event that it sought a decisive engagement.

Sinking

Casualties included 21 officers and 227 enlisted men. The subsequent investigation blamed Austro-Hungarian saboteurs, but unstable propellant may well have been responsible.

The Regia Marina wanted to raise the ship and rejected initial plans to demolish the wreck with explosives. They ultimately settled on a plan to make the ship's hull airtight and raise it using compressed air and pontoons. This required that the ship's coal, ammunition, and gun turrets be removed or cut loose, respectively, by divers to reduce her weight. A further complication was that the largest drydock in Taranto had a maximum depth of only  and the upside-down Leonardo da Vinci drew . This meant that her funnels had to be cut off as well.

All of this preparation required over two years and the ship was refloated on 17 September 1919. A deep channel had been dredged from her location to the drydock and she was moved there. A special wooden framework had to be built to support her, still inverted, after the water in the drydock had been drained. Her decks were not designed to handle the stresses involved in her unique situation and had to be reinforced to withstand the weight of the hull and preliminary repairs were made in preparation for righting her. The Regia Marina planned to modernize Leonardo da Vinci by replacing her amidships turret with six  anti-aircraft guns, but ultimately lacked the funds to do so and sold her for scrap on 22 March 1923.

Footnotes

References

Further reading

External links
 World War I Document Archive: Ship Photo Gallery
 A naïve ex-voto (votive painting playing the same role as a church ship in Italian culture) depicting the explosion on board the ship is in the chapel of Trecastagni (Sicily), donated by a sailor who "miraculously" escaped the blast.
 Leonardo da Vinci on the Marina Militare website

Conte di Cavour-class battleships
World War I battleships of Italy
1911 ships
Maritime incidents in 1916
Ships sunk by non-combat internal explosions
Shipwrecks of Italy
World War I shipwrecks in the Mediterranean Sea
Ships built in Genoa
Leonardo da Vinci